WUBG may refer to:

 WUBG (AM), a radio station (1570 AM) licensed to serve Methuen, Massachusetts, United States
 WZRL, a radio station (98.3 FM) licensed to serve Plainfield, Indiana, United States, which held the call sign WUBG from 2015 to 2016